Dvor is a settlement in central Slovenia, immediately northwest of the capital Ljubljana. It belongs to the Ljubljana Urban Municipality. It is part of the traditional region of Upper Carniola and is now included with the rest of the municipality in the Central Slovenia Statistical Region.

Earthworks that were part of a prehistoric Early Iron Age settlement were identified near the settlement in 2006.

References

External links
Dvor on Geopedia

Populated places in the City Municipality of Ljubljana
Šentvid District